Kilmarnock Football Club, commonly known as Killie, is a Scottish professional football team based in the town of Kilmarnock, East Ayrshire. The team is currently managed by Derek McInnes, who was appointed in January 2022. The club has achieved several honours since its formation in 1869, most recently the 2011–12 Scottish League Cup after a 1–0 win over Celtic at Hampden Park and the Scottish Championship title in 2022.

Kilmarnock Football Club is currently the oldest football club in the Scottish Premiership, and also the second-oldest professional club in Scotland. Home matches are played at Rugby Park, a 17,889 capacity all-seater stadium situated in the town itself. Kilmarnock took part in the first-ever official match in the Scottish Cup against the now-defunct Renton in 1873. The club have qualified for European competitions on nine occasions, their best performance coming in the 1966–67 Fairs Cup when they progressed to the semi-finals, eventually being eliminated by Leeds United. The club is also one of only a few Scottish clubs to have played in three European competitions (European Cup, Cup Winners' Cup and the UEFA Cup).

Kilmarnock has a long-standing football rivalry with fellow Ayrshire side Ayr United, with both teams playing frequently in the Ayrshire derby in which both sides first met in September 1910. Kilmarnock have long been the most successful side in the Ayrshire derby, winning 189 times in 256 meetings. The club nickname, Killie, is the Scottish term for the town of Kilmarnock.

History

Formation and early years

The club's foundation dates back to the very earliest days of organised football in Scotland, when a group of local cricketers looking for a sporting pursuit to occupy them outside of the cricket season looked to form a football club. On 5 January 1869 the club was founded during a general meeting at Robertson's Temperance Hotel on Portland Street. Originally they played a game more similar to rugby and these origins are reflected to this day by the name of the club's home ground – Rugby Park. The difficulty in organising fixtures under this code and the growing influence of Queen's Park soon persuaded them to adopt the association code instead. At this time, the club played games in a number locations including Holm Quarry, the Grange on Irvine Road and a location close to the current Rugby Park.

Following the formation of Scotland's earliest football clubs in the 1860s, football experienced a rapid growth but there was no formal structure, and matches were often arranged in a haphazard and irregular fashion.

Queen's Park, a Glasgow club founded in 1867, took the lead, and following an advertisement in a Glasgow newspaper in 1873, representatives from seven clubs – Queen's Park, Clydesdale, Vale of Leven, Dumbreck, Third Lanark, Eastern and Granville – attended a meeting on 13 March 1873. Furthermore, Kilmarnock sent a letter stating their willingness to form the Scottish Football Association.

That day, these eight clubs formed the Scottish Football Association, and resolved that: The clubs here represented form themselves into an association for the promotion of football according to the rules of The Football Association and that the clubs connected with this association subscribe for a challenge cup to be played for annually, the committee to propose the laws of the competition.

Kilmarnock also competed in the inaugural Scottish Cup tournament in 1873–74. Their 2–0 defeat against Renton in the First Round on 18 October 1873 is thought to have been the first match ever played in the competition.

Kilmarnock joined the Scottish League in 1895 and after winning consecutive Second Division titles were elected to the top flight for the first time in 1899. In 1920 Kilmarnock won the Scottish Cup for the first time, beating Albion Rovers at Hampden Park. This was followed by their second success in 1929 where they beat massive favourites Rangers 2–0 at the national stadium in front of a crowd of 114,708 people. They soon reached another final against the same opposition in 1932 but this time were beaten after a replay, and the same outcome followed in the 1938 final against East Fife, Killie this time the team on the receiving end of an upset.

Late 20th century
 
In 1964–65 Heart of Midlothian fought out a championship title race with Willie Waddell's Kilmarnock. In the era of two points for a win Hearts were three points clear with two games remaining. Hearts drew with Dundee United meaning the last game of the season with the two title challengers playing each other at Tynecastle would be a league decider. Kilmarnock needed to win by a two-goal margin to take the title. Hearts entered the game as favourites with both a statistical and home advantage. They also had a solid pedigree of trophy-winning under Tommy Walker. Waddell's Kilmarnock in contrast had been nearly men. Four times in the previous five seasons they had finished league runners-up including Hearts' triumph in 1960. Killie had also lost three domestic cup finals during the same period including the 1962 League Cup Final defeat to Hearts. Hearts had won five of the six senior cup finals they played in under Walker. Even the final they had lost was in a replay after drawing the first game. Hearts' Roald Jensen hit the post after six minutes. Kilmarnock then scored twice through Davie Sneddon and Brian McIlroy after 27 and 29 minutes. Alan Gordon had an excellent chance to clinch the title for Hearts in second half injury time but was denied by a Bobby Ferguson diving save pushing the ball past the post. The 2–0 defeat meant Hearts lost the title by an average of 0.042 goals. Subsequently, Hearts were instrumental in pushing through a change to use goal difference to separate teams level on points. Ironically this rule change later denied Hearts the title in 1985–86. This is the only time to date Killie have been Scottish champions.

Decline in the 1980s brought relegation to the Second Division. Killie returned to the top division with promotion in 1993. They lifted the Scottish Cup for the third time in 1997 thanks to a 1–0 victory over Falkirk in the final.

The club have qualified for European competitions on nine occasions, their best performance coming in the 1966–67 Fairs Cup when they progressed to the semi-finals, eventually being eliminated by Leeds United. The club is also one of only a few Scottish clubs to have played in all three European competitions (European Cup, Cup Winners' Cup and the UEFA Cup).

21st Century

Kilmarnock reached the 2007 Scottish League Cup Final, but suffered a 5–1 defeat in the final by Hibernian. After selling Steven Naismith to Rangers for a club-record fee in August 2007, Killie struggled in the 2007–08 Scottish Premier League, finishing in 11th place with 40 points. In January 2010, Kilmarnock were second bottom of the 2009–10 Scottish Premier League, with last placed Falkirk just two points behind. On 11 January 2010, Jim Jefferies left the club by "mutual consent" and Jimmy Calderwood was appointed manager. Kilmarnock then achieved a first win in nine years against Celtic. Continued poor form, however, meant a final day showdown at Rugby Park with Falkirk for SPL survival. Kilmarnock began the game with a two-point advantage over their rivals and a goalless draw on the day was good enough to secure top-flight football for another year. They ended the season with just 33 points, their worst points finish in the SPL.

After Calderwood left at the end of the season, Mixu Paatelainen was appointed manager for the next two years with an option for a third. Despite being the favourites for relegation that season, Kilmarnock finished the season in fifth position. Paatelainen left the club to become manager of Finland and his assistant Kenny Shiels was appointed manager. Kilmarnock progressed to the 2012 Scottish League Cup Final with wins against Queen of the South, East Fife and Ayr United in an Ayrshire derby at Hampden. Kilmarnock won the League Cup for the first time, as they defeated Celtic 1–0 in the final; Dieter van Tornhout scored the only goal six minutes from time, with goalkeeper Cammy Bell named Man of the Match. In June 2013, after three years at Kilmarnock, manager Kenny Shiels was sacked by chairman Michael Johnston after a "mutual agreement" between the two.

Allan Johnston signed a two-year contract and was appointed manager on 24 June 2013, with Sandy Clark as the assistant manager. Clark left his role in the summer of 2014 with the club looking to go in a new direction, and ex-Killie player and former Hearts manager Gary Locke was appointed as his assistant. Johnston was sacked in February 2015 after informing the press of his intention to leave in the summer, before discussing this with the board. Locke was placed in interim charge, before signing a three-year deal in April 2015. Kilmarnock went on to lose seven of their final eight games of the season, but were spared the play-off spot after a 4–1 win over Partick Thistle.

The 2015–16 season would prove difficult for the team. Locke was removed from his position as manager in February 2016, with Lee Clark being appointed as his replacement. Despite a small uplift in form, the team finished in 11th place and faced a relegation play-off against Championship side Falkirk in order to stay in the top flight. Despite losing 0–1 in the first leg, Killie fought back and comfortably won the second leg 4–0 (4–1 on aggregate), securing the club's status in the Scottish Premiership for another season. Clark would leave Kilmarnock for a return to England with Bury in February 2017, exactly a year after his arrival. Former Rangers player Lee McCulloch, assistant to both Locke and Clark, was placed in temporary charge until the end of the season, achieving an eighth-place finish. The following season saw another poor start, with an early defeat to rivals Ayr United in the league cup group stages, followed by a disappointing start to the league campaign. McCulloch was sacked in September 2017 with the club rooted to the bottom of the table.

The Clarke era

In an unexpected move, Kilmarnock appointed former Chelsea and West Bromwich Albion coach Steve Clarke. It was Clarke's first involvement with the Scottish game in 30 years and his appointment preempted a dramatic upturn in form, with the club ultimately finishing in fifth place, earning him the SFWA Manager of the Year award in the process. The 2018–19 season saw Kilmarnock celebrate their 150th anniversary, and the team continued their strong form in the league, both home and away, culminating in a final day fixture against Rangers at Rugby Park. Kilmarnock won the match 2–1 and the result secured a third-place finish in the league, which guaranteed European football for the first time since 2001. The season's results also set a new record points total for the club and their highest placed finish in the league since 1966. The following day, Clarke was signed by the Scottish FA to become the head coach of the Scotland national team.

Following the departure of Steve Clarke, Kilmarnock had three managers whose spell in charge was brief, beginning with former Juventus and Chelsea assistant coach Angelo Alessio. In Alessio's second match in charge, Kilmarnock lost in Europa League qualification to Welsh Premier League club Connah's Quay Nomads. Alessio was sacked in December 2019, with the team sitting in fifth place. Following his departure, Alex Dyer, assistant coach to both Alessio and Clarke, was appointed on an initial caretaker basis until the end of the season, before all football was abruptly ended due to the COVID-19 pandemic. Dyer's services were retained by the club and he signed a new contract extension in June 2020. However, following a poor start to the new season, he left the club by mututal consent in January 2021. In February 2021, former St Johnstone manager Tommy Wright was appointed as the club's third manager in two years.

Relegation and promotion

On 24 May 2021, following a play−off defeat to Dundee, Kilmarnock were relegated to the Scottish Championship, bringing an end to their 28-year stay in the top flight. Tommy Wright was sacked in December 2021 with the team sitting fourth place in the Championship. Former Aberdeen manager Derek McInnes was quickly appointed as his successor. Results improved, and by the end of the 2021–22 season Killie were promoted back to the top flight of Scottish football at the first attempt, defeating closest challengers Arbroath 2–1 on the penultimate matchday with a dramatic last-minute winner from Blair Alston.

Ownership and finances
Since June 1906, Kilmarnock F.C. has been owned by the private limited company The Kilmarnock Football Club Ltd.

Since 2014, the majority shareholder of the club is Ayrshire businessman Billy Bowie, who oversees all operations of the club. Kilmarnock became debt-free under Bowie's control in 2017 after several years of financial difficulty.

In May 2018 Kilmarnock made a landmark move by appointing Phyllis McLeish, commercial director of the QTS Group, to the club's board and in doing so became the first female board member in over 20 years. Later that same month, the club appointed its second female board member in Cathy Jamieson, former MP for the Kilmarnock and Loudoun district and a life-long Killie fan. Her appointment came after being nominated by The Killie Trust Initiative l, who raised over £100,000 to have a member of the trust on the board.

Ayrshire Derby
Kilmarnock's biggest rivalry is with their South Ayrshire neighbours Ayr United and together they contest the Ayrshire derby. The fixture has been played 256 times since their first meeting on 14 September 1910. Killie have won on 189 occasions. This fixture will be revived in season 2021–22, as both clubs will be in the same division following Kilmarnock's relegation to the Scottish Championship.

Colours and badge

The earliest known Kilmarnock kit from 1879 consisted of an all-blue jersey with white trousers. The shirt bore a crest which was described as "a hand, index and second fingers upright, thumb outstretched, other fingers enclosed over a palm" (an adoption of the historic Clan Boyd chief's heraldic crest). The hand rested on a bar over a ball marked KFC. Between 1887 and 1890 Kilmarnock wore black and white striped tops. Thereafter, the club has predominantly played in blue and white striped or hooped shirts with either blue or white shorts. The club have also occasionally played in plain blue and plain white tops; this was suggested by Ross Quigley who, at the time, was one of the first directors of the club, although the kit was later changed to the hooped style in 1920. The club's away colours have varied greatly over time. Yellow is generally regarded as the club's main third colour; but white, red and purple away kits have also appeared in recent years.

Between 2008 and 2014, the club manufactured their kits under their own sportswear brand, 1869. Following this, Italian company Erreá was the manufacturer. Kilmarnock kits were manufactured by American company Nike between 2016 and 2020. The current kit manufacturer is Danish company Hummel; it can only be bought from the store at Rugby Park.

The club badge is a modernised version of previous club badges. It features a ball bearing a hand in a blessing position, flanked by two red squirrels. The club's Latin motto, confidemus (we trust), is written above the badge (similar to the Clan Boyd heraldic motto, confido (I trust)). The club adopted the badge in 1992 after The Lord Lyon decreed that the previous badge, based heavily upon the town crest, was in breach of ancient Scottish heraldic rules.

In October 2018 the club unveiled a special badge for the club's 150th anniversary.

Kit Manufacturers

Shirt sponsors

Mascot
The club's mascot is a squirrel named 'Captain Conker' after the squirrels found on the club's crest and the Boyd coats of arms. In the past the 'Killie Pie' mascot was also a regular at Rugby Park on matchdays. Previously the mascot was Nutz the squirrel, played by long-time Kilmarnock fan Ian Downie who died in 2020.

Stadium

Kilmarnock first played football matches at the present Rugby Park site in 1899. Despite this, the venue is actually Kilmarnock's fourth home ground. The Grange, Holm Quarry and Ward's Park all hosted matches before the club moved to Rugby Park in 1877. This was not the present stadium, but one situated close by near South Hamilton Street. This ground was shared by cricket and rugby teams – sports which Kilmarnock had played previously – and the connection with rugby gave the ground its name. This name was taken with the club when they moved to their present stadium.

During the 1994–95 season the stadium capacity was significantly reduced as three new stands were constructed; the Moffat Stand, the Chadwick Stand and the East Stand. The stadium opened on 6 August 1995, in a friendly match against English champions Blackburn Rovers. Mike Newell hit a hat-trick as the home team lost 5–0.

A FIFA 2 star FieldTurf artificial pitch was installed at Rugby Park for the start of the 2014–15 season. The pitch is capable of hosting rugby matches as well as football. A new artificial hybrid surface was installed during the 2019 close season.

In February 2019 Kilmarnock received approval to install a new safe-standing section in areas of the East and Moffat stands. The installation process was completed in early December of that year.

In December 2022 Kilmarnock announced that consultation had begun on the plans to develop 'Bowie Park Training Facility' with a view to creating a dedicated club training ground where Kilmarnock’s men’s, women’s and academy teams can develop within the same purpose-built environment.

Funded by Billy Bowie, the proposal includes the creation of two five-a-side and two full-size pitches – one with an accompanying 500-seat stand – alongside a two-floor training facility building which features a gym, changing rooms, canteen / seminar room, offices and a players’ lounge.

Players

First team squad

On loan

Notable Academy Graduates

Since formation of the Scottish Premier League (1998)

Ross Barbour
Cammy Bell
Kris Boyd
Innes Cameron
Peter Canero
Kyle Connell
Euan Deveney
Paul di Giacomo 
James Fowler
Jamie Hamill
Dean Hawkshaw
Garry Hay

Matty Kennedy
Greg Kiltie
Barrie McKay
Rory McKenzie
Lewis Morrison
Steven Naismith
Mark O'Hara
Graeme Smith
David Syme
Ally Taylor 
Greg Taylor
Iain Wilson

Non-playing staff

Board of directors

Management

Managerial statistics

Information correct as of matches played 30 January 2021. Only official Scottish League, Scottish Cup, Scottish League Cup and European Competition matches are counted

Club records
Second oldest club in Scotland
Biggest competitive win: 13–2 v Saltcoats Victoria, Scottish Qualifying Cup 2nd Round, 12 September 1896
Worst defeat: 1–9 v Celtic, Scottish League Division 1, 13 August 1938
Highest home attendance: 35,995 v Rangers, Scottish Cup Quarter-Finals 10 March 1962
Most League goals in a season: Harry Cunningham (34 in 1927–28) and Andy Kerr (34 in 1960–61)
Transfer fee paid: £340,000 for Paul Wright from St Johnstone, March 1995
Transfer fee received: £2,200,000 for Greg Taylor to Celtic, August 2019

Honours and accolades

National
Scottish Football League (first tier):
Winners: 1964–65
Runners-up (4): 1959–60, 1960–61, 1962–63, 1963–64
Scottish First Division / Scottish Championship (second tier):
Winners: 1897–98, 1898–99, 2021–22
Runners-up (6): 1953–54, 1973–74, 1975–76, 1978–79, 1981–82, 1992–93
Scottish Second Division (third tier):
Runners-up: 1989–90
Scottish Cup:
Winners: 1919–20, 1928–29, 1996–97
Runners-up (5): 1897–98, 1931–32, 1937–38, 1956–57, 1959–60
Scottish League Cup:
Winners: 2011–12
Runners-up (5): 1952–53, 1960–61, 1962–63, 2000–01, 2006–07
Scottish Qualifying Cup:
Winners: 1896–97

Other
Inter-Cities Fairs Cup:
Semi-finalists: 1966–67
International Soccer League:
Runners-up: 1960
Tennent Caledonian Cup:
Winners: 1979–80
UEFA Respect Fair Play ranking:
Winners: 1999
 Ayrshire Cup (44): 1884, 1885, 1886, 1891, 1896, 1897, 1898, 1899, 1900, 1921, 1922, 1923, 1928, 1930, 1931, 1935, 1947, 1951, 1952, 1953, 1954, 1955, 1956, 1957, 1959 (shared), 1960, 1962, 1966, 1972, 1973, 1974, 1979, 1981, 1982, 1983, 1984, 1985, 1987, 1990, 1992, 1993, 1994, 1996, 1998
Source:

Hall of Fame

2014 inductees
 The Founding Fathers – Founders of Kilmarnock Football Club
 Kilmarnock FC 1964–65 Squad
 Hugh Allen M.B.E. – Club Physiotherapist 1968–2002 
 Willie Culley – All-time record goalscorer
 Alan Robertson – Most Scottish League Appearances
 Mattha Smith – Scottish Cup Winner 1920 & 1929

2016 inductees
 James Fowler – Captain 2012 League Cup Winners
 Tommy McLean – Golden Era Award
 Stuart McLean – 2nd Highest League Appearances
 Ray Montgomerie – Captain 1997 Scottish Cup Winners
 Eddie Morrison – Highest Post-War Goalscorer 
 Manuel Pascali – 1st International Award

2018 inductees
 Frank Beattie – Golden Era Award
 Paul Clarke – Legends Award
 Frédéric Dindeleux – International Award
 Ronnie Hamilton – Legends Award
 Garry Hay – Legends Award
 Derrick McDicken –  Legends Award
 Willie Waddell – Manager 1964–65 League Championship Winners
 Bobby Williamson – Manager 1997 Scottish Cup Winners

2022 inductees

 Kenny Sheils – Manager 2012 Scottish League Cup Final 
 Alan McCulloch – Former Goalkeeper
 Kris Boyd – Scored 121 League Goals

Club anthem
The song "Paper Roses", originally a hit by American singer and activist Anita Bryant, was adopted by Kilmarnock fans as their own club anthem. American singer and actress Marie Osmond, who is famous for recording this song, surprised the fans in February 2013 and performed at Rugby Park along with a meet and greet session, signing autographs for the players and fans.

See also
 Kilmarnock FC Women
 Howard Park, Kilmarnock
 Killie pie

References

External links

 
 KillieFC.com Unofficial Fans' Website, Archive & Forums
 Kilmarnock on the BBC
 Club information at Fitbastats.com

 
Football clubs in Scotland
Association football clubs established in 1869
Defunct Scottish rugby union clubs
Scottish Premier League teams
Sport in Kilmarnock
1869 establishments in Scotland
Scottish Football League teams
Scottish Cup winners
South of Scotland Football League teams
Scottish Professional Football League teams
Scottish Football Association founder members
Scottish League Cup winners
Football in East Ayrshire